Screaming Headless Torsos, also known as the Torsos or SHT is a jazz rock band formed in 1989 consisting of founding member and guitarist David Fiuczynski, vocalist Freedom Bremner, bassist David Ginyard, percussionist Daniel Sadownick, and the alternating drum chair of Jojo Mayer, Gene Lake, Skoota Warner and James "Biscuit" Rouse.

On September 26, 2014, Screaming Headless Torsos released the much anticipated Code Red, their first new record in 9 years. The album is true to the Torsos gumbo of styles but marks some noticeable sonic progressions. The 11-song album features guest artists and a new vocal sound. Code Red is the first Torsos record featuring vocals and vocal arrangements by lead singer Freedom Bremner. The album was produced by Torsos veteran producer Gregg Fine with, three tracks "Code Red", "Wizard of Woo", and Sideways, being co-produced by 14 time Grammy award winning producer, Ron Saint Germain (Muse, Living Colour, Michael Jackson, 311, Diana Ross). Guest performances by guitarist James Valentine (Maroon 5) on track 2, "Brooce Swayne", keyboardists Casey Benjamin (Robert Glasper Experiment) and Chris Fisher (Funk Nuveau) both performing contrasting vocoder /synthesizer vocals on track 6, "Sideways" and the legendary keyboardist Bernie Worrell (Parliament- Funkadelic, The Talking Heads) lays his psychedelic handy work on track 3 "Wizard of Woo", a tribute written in Bernie's honor by Fiuczynski.

Historically the Torsos' music mixes and mashes guitar-driven rock, jazz, hip-hop, funk, soul, r&b, reggae, and drum-and-bass grooves and concepts, along with future-shock percussion, improvisation, acrobatic vocals, and most recently Fiuczynski's eastern, Arabic, and African, microtonal guitar influences. SHT's original line up was guitarist David Fiuczynski, vocalist Dean Bowman, bassist Fima Ephron, percussionist Daniel Sadownick, and drummer Jojo Mayer (Nerve). Drummer Gene Lake joined the Torsos, replacing Jojo Mayer for their 2001 album Live!! and the album "Torsos 2005". In 2001 vocalist Freedom Bremner replaced Dean Bowman. He joined the band officially in 2004 and was featured along with Dean Bowman on the album "Torsos 2005". Fima Ephron, featured on all the Torsos' albums, left the band in 2004 replaced briefly by bassist Steve Jenkins until 2008 and the entrance of David Ginyard. Screaming Headless Torsos has also featured many of New York's top musicians during their live performances including Sofia Ramos (vocals), John Medeski, (keyboards), rapper Ahmed Best, and Reggie Washington, (bass). The Torsos' rhythm section has also at times served as the backing band for artist, Meshell Ndegeocello, for both live in concert and on her early recordings.

Prior to the release of Code Red, Screaming Headless Torsos toured heavily in Mexico and Latin America and sporadically in Europe, but was absent in the United States. After 5 years without releasing new music, SHT released the single and companion video for the song, "Dead Christmas Trees" in 2010. In March 2012 SHT was invited to play Vive Latino 2012 in Mexico City, the largest indie Rock Festival in the Americas. It was the beginning of a resurgence for the band. As a result of that performance at Vive Latino, which aired on Coca-Cola television throughout Latin America, SHT was invited to Colombia's Jazz al Parque Festival and on September 9, 2012, SHT performed for an audience of 20,000 at the festival in Bogotá Colombia, the largest jazz festival in South America. At that show SHT introduced a new keyboard player/vocalist, Akie Bermiss, from the New York City band Abaraki. Currently, the band is touring and promoting Code Red. On September 27, 2014, the "Code Red Europe Tour" launched with a performance at the Berklee Beantown Jazz Festival in Boston Massachusetts, followed by 15 concerts in Germany, Austria, The Netherlands, Poland, The Czech Republic and Switzerland. The band is planning a US tour, more dates in South America and Mexico, as well as the second leg of Code Red Tour Europe in March 2015 with concerts in Italy, Spain, France, Portugal, Luxembourg, Belgium, Slovenia, Slovakia, Poland and some debuts in several countries in Eastern Europe.

Discography

 1995 (1995)
 Live!! (2001)
 2005 (2005)
 Live in New York & Paris(DVD) (2005) -recorded at the Knitting Factory in New York City and at the club New Morning in Paris.
 Choice Cuts (2006)
 Dead Christmas Trees single (2011)
 Code Red (2014)

References

External links
Official Screaming Headless Torsos band web site
Official Screaming Headless Torsos Facebook page

American experimental musical groups
Musical groups established in 1989
Jazz-funk musicians